Chira River or Rio Chira is the name of a river (as well as valley) in northern Peru whose mouth is 100 km north west of the provincial capital of Piura and 25 km north of the port of Paita.

Its source is in the Ecuadorian Andes near the town of Papaca in the province Loja from where it flows for ca 250 km in westerly directions. After crossing the border to Peru, it is dammed up in the 885 million  m³ Poechos reservoir and later passes the town of Sullana.

References

Rivers of Ecuador
Rivers of Peru
Rivers of Piura Region
Geography of Loja Province
International rivers of South America